Zak Hilditch is an Australian director and writer.  He's known for 1922 (2017), These Final Hours (2013) and Transmission (2012).

Filmography
Short films

Feature films

See also
List of Australian film directors

References

External links 
 

Australian film directors
Australian screenwriters
Year of birth missing (living people)
Living people